Leptopsaltria is a genus of cicadas from Southeast Asia and typical of the tribe Leptopsaltriini.

List of species
 Leptopsaltria andamanensis Distant, 1888
 Leptopsaltria phra Distant, 1913
 Leptopsaltria samia Walker, F., 1850
 Leptopsaltria tuberosa (Signoret, 1847) - type species (as Cicada tuberosa Signoret, 1847).

References

External links

Leptopsaltriini
Cicadidae genera
Taxa named by Carl Stål